Wilhelm von Wrangell (9 August 1894, Võru – 26 December 1976, Lilienthal, West Germany) was an Estonian politician. He was a member of IV Riigikogu. He was a member of the Riigikogu since 29 January 1930. He replaced Erich Friedrich Valter. On 31 January 1930, he resigned his position and he was replaced by Mathias Westerblom.

References

1894 births
1976 deaths
People from Võru
People from Kreis Werro
Baltic-German people
German-Baltic Party politicians
Members of the Riigikogu, 1929–1932
Members of the Riigikogu, 1932–1934
Members of the Riiginõukogu
Estonian military personnel of the Estonian War of Independence
Estonian emigrants to Germany